Wigginton may refer to:

England 
 Wigginton, Hertfordshire
 Wigginton, North Yorkshire
 Wigginton, Oxfordshire
 Wigginton, Shropshire, a location
 Wigginton, Staffordshire

Surname 
 Eliot Wigginton (b. 1942), American oral historian
 Giles Wigginton (16th century), English clergyman
 Lindell Wigginton (b. 1998), Canadian basketball player
 Peter D. Wigginton (1839–1890), American politician
 Randy Wigginton, American computer engineer
 Ron Wigginton (b. 1944), American artist
 Searson Wigginton (1909–1977), English cricketer
 Tracey Wigginton (b. 1965), Australian murderer
 Ty Wigginton (b. 1977), American baseball player